Joel Corey (born 17 February 1982) is a former Australian rules footballer who played for the Geelong Football Club in the Australian Football League (AFL).

Corey is a dual Carji Greeves Medallist, two-time All-Australian, and was part of Geelong's AFL premiership-winning teams in 2007, 2009 and 2011. He was also selected in the Dream Team, a representative Australian rules football team that contested in the AFL Hall of Fame Tribute Match, as well as being selected to represent Australia in International rules football.

Corey currently serves as a development coach for the Fremantle Football Club.

Career

Corey was drafted with Geelong's 8th pick in the 1999 draft as a 17-year-old. He has since built a reputation as a tall, consistent, hard-running midfielder with an uncanny ability at clearing the ball from tight, pack situations. Corey is an important cog in the Geelong midfield, and if needed can play a defensive role within the team. Though he often goes unnoticed, Corey consistently gets the job done and because he has such a star-studded midfield around him he does not have the burden of getting the number one tag each week.

Highlights of his career to date include a 2005 Carji Greeves Medal victory, selection in the Australian International Rules team of 2004, and selection as an All-Australian in 2007 and 2008. Corey played an integral part in Geelong's record breaking 2007 Grand Final win. In the same year he was part of the 6-man leadership group at Geelong.

Statistics

|-
|- style="background-color: #EAEAEA"
! scope="row" style="text-align:center" | 2000
|style="text-align:center;"|
| 11 || 5 || 2 || 2 || 39 || 23 || 62 || 11 || 8 || 0.4 || 0.4 || 7.8 || 4.6 || 12.4 || 2.2 || 1.6
|-
! scope="row" style="text-align:center" | 2001
|style="text-align:center;"|
| 11 || 14 || 3 || 4 || 102 || 36 || 138 || 39 || 26 || 0.2 || 0.3 || 7.3 || 2.6 || 9.9 || 2.8 || 1.9
|- style="background-color: #EAEAEA"
! scope="row" style="text-align:center" | 2002
|style="text-align:center;"|
| 11 || 20 || 5 || 4 || 198 || 165 || 363 || 57 || 61 || 0.3 || 0.2 || 9.9 || 8.3 || 18.2 || 2.9 || 3.1
|-
! scope="row" style="text-align:center" | 2003
|style="text-align:center;"|
| 11 || 22 || 9 || 6 || 250 || 157 || 407 || 78 || 70 || 0.4 || 0.3 || 11.4 || 7.1 || 18.5 || 3.5 || 3.2
|- style="background-color: #EAEAEA"
! scope="row" style="text-align:center" | 2004
|style="text-align:center;"|
| 11 || 22 || 9 || 13 || 242 || 173 || 415 || 92 || 75 || 0.4 || 0.6 || 11.0 || 7.9 || 18.9 || 4.2 || 3.4
|-
! scope="row" style="text-align:center" | 2005
|style="text-align:center;"|
| 11 || 21 || 5 || 11 || 292 || 205 || 497 || 120 || 81 || 0.2 || 0.5 || 13.9 || 9.8 || 23.7 || 5.7 || 3.9
|- style="background-color: #EAEAEA"
! scope="row" style="text-align:center" | 2006
|style="text-align:center;"|
| 11 || 22 || 8 || 4 || 298 || 231 || 529 || 107 || 64 || 0.4 || 0.2 || 13.5 || 10.5 || 24.0 || 4.9 || 2.9
|-
! scope="row" style="text-align:center" | 2007
|style="text-align:center;"|
| 11 || 25 || 7 || 9 || 338 || 312 || 650 || 119 || 134 || 0.3 || 0.4 || 13.5 || 12.5 || 26.0 || 4.8 || 5.4
|- style="background-color: #EAEAEA"
! scope="row" style="text-align:center" | 2008
|style="text-align:center;"|
| 11 || 25 || 6 || 7 || 339 || 391 || 730 || 116 || 138 || 0.2 || 0.3 || 13.6 || 15.6 || 29.2 || 4.6 || 5.5
|-
! scope="row" style="text-align:center;" | 2009
|style="text-align:center;"|
| 11 || 23 || 7 || 4 || 306 || 356 || 662 || 106 || 115 || 0.3 || 0.2 || 13.3 || 15.5 || 28.8 || 4.6 || 5.0
|- style="background-color: #EAEAEA"
! scope="row" style="text-align:center" | 2010
|style="text-align:center;"|
| 11 || 14 || 2 || 3 || 153 || 185 || 338 || 51 || 71 || 0.1 || 0.2 || 10.9 || 13.2 || 24.1 || 3.6 || 5.1
|-
! scope="row" style="text-align:center;" | 2011
|style="text-align:center;"|
| 11 || 21 || 8 || 5 || 257 || 262 || 519 || 77 || 90 || 0.4 || 0.2 || 12.2 || 12.5 || 24.7 || 3.7 || 4.3
|- style="background-color: #EAEAEA"
! scope="row" style="text-align:center" | 2012
|style="text-align:center;"|
| 11 || 20 || 3 || 5 || 189 || 239 || 428 || 54 || 103 || 0.2 || 0.3 || 9.5 || 12.0 || 21.4 || 2.7 || 5.2
|-
! scope="row" style="text-align:center" | 2013
|style="text-align:center;"|
| 11 || 22 || 5 || 3 || 170 || 288 || 458 || 72 || 103 || 0.2 || 0.1 || 7.7 || 13.1 || 20.8 || 3.3 || 4.7
|- class="sortbottom"
! colspan=3| Career
! 276
! 79
! 80
! 3173
! 3023
! 6196
! 1099
! 1139
! 0.3
! 0.3
! 11.5
! 11.0
! 22.4
! 4.0
! 4.1
|}

Honours and achievements

AFL
AFL Premiership Player (2007, 2009, 2011)
2-time All-Australian (2007, 2008)
AFL Pre-Season Premiership Player (2006)
International Rules Series Representative (2004)
Western Australia State of Origin (2005, 2006, 2007)

Geelong Football Club
Geelong Best and Fairest Winner (2005, 2008)
Geelong Football Club Coach's Award (2005)
Geelong Football Club Most Determined & Most Dedicated Player Award (2002)

U18 Juniors
All Australian U/18 (1999)
Western Australia U/18 (1999)
Ron Barassi Medalist (1999)
U17 International Rules (1999)

Milestones:
 AFL debut: Round 17, 2000 (vs. ) at the Telstra Dome (Geelong lost by 24 points)
 Finals debut: Elimination final, 2000 (vs. ) at the Telstra Dome (Geelong lost by 9 points)
 50th game: Round 11, 2003 (vs. ) at the Telstra Dome (Geelong won by 40 points)
 100th game: Round 20, 2005 (vs. ) at Skilled Stadium (Geelong lost by 1 point)
 150th game: Preliminary final, 2007 (vs. ) at the Melbourne Cricket Ground (Geelong won by 5 points)
 200th game: Round 1, 2010 (vs. ) at the Melbourne Cricket Ground (Geelong won by 31 points)

Personal life
Corey graduated from John Septimus Roe Anglican Community School in 1999. He was a junior Australian representative in baseball when he was younger, but Corey gave baseball up to pursue a football career. Outside of football, Corey is a quiet, humble person who does not particularly enjoy doing interviews saying even in Primary school speaking in front of the class wasn't his forte.

Corey enjoys surfing, in Torquay with teammate Cameron Ling, as he finds it "pretty peaceful, it clears your head". His nickname, Smithy, comes from the fact that his surname is also a popular boys given name. Corey has two dogs, a Kelpie and a Staffordshire terrier.

References

External links

Geelong Football Club players
Geelong Football Club Premiership players
1982 births
Living people
Carji Greeves Medal winners
East Perth Football Club players
All-Australians (AFL)
Australian rules footballers from Perth, Western Australia
West Australian Football Hall of Fame inductees
Australia international rules football team players
Three-time VFL/AFL Premiership players